Hermann Anschütz (12 October 1802 – 30 August 1880) was a German painter and professor at the Royal Academy of Fine Arts in Munich. He is associated with the Düsseldorf school of painting.

Anschütz was born in Koblenz. His father Joseph Andreas Anschütz was an eminent musician and was in charge of a school for vocal and instrumental instruction, and Hermann's younger brother Karl Anschütz ended up as an opera conductor in the United States.

He lived at Promenade Straße 1 in Munich around 1850.  He died in Munich, where he was buried on the Old Southern Cemetery (Alter Südfriedhof).

See also
 List of German painters

References

External links

 ADB 
 Photo

1802 births
1880 deaths
19th-century German painters
19th-century German male artists
German male painters
Artists from Koblenz
Academic staff of the Academy of Fine Arts, Munich
19th-century painters of historical subjects
People from the Rhine Province
Düsseldorf school of painting